Ian Andre Roberts (born December 18, 1976) is a former Guyanese Olympic athlete and educator. He is the current superintendent of the Millcreek Township School District in Millcreek Township, Erie County, Pennsylvania.

Sports career 
As a male middle distance runner from Guyana, Ian specialized in the 800m.  He competed in the 2000 Summer Olympic Games in Sydney, Australia. He won his first international medal, winning the 1999 Central American and Caribbean Championships in Athletics in Bridgetown, Barbados where he won the gold medal.  He competed in the Middle Eastern Athletic Conference where he won several conference titles and placed sixth in the 800m at the NCAA Championships.  He went on to St. John's University where he competed in the Big East Conference winning several championships, and making the NCAA finals in 1999.

After winning conference titles in both Division 1 Conferences, he competed internationally.  He competed in the 1999 World Indoor Championships in Maebashi, Japan but failed to advance past the quarter finals.  He competed in the 1999 World Outdoor Championships in Seville, Spain but failed to advance past the quarter finals.  He competed in the 1999 Pan-American Games in Winnipeg, Canada where he fell in the 800m finals.

References

External links 

 
 Profile at Sports-Reference.com
 Profile  at All-Athletics.com

1973 births
Living people
Athletes (track and field) at the 2000 Summer Olympics
Olympic athletes of Guyana
Athletes (track and field) at the 1999 Pan American Games
Pan American Games competitors for Guyana
World Athletics Championships athletes for Guyana
Guyanese male middle-distance runners
St. John's Red Storm men's track and field athletes
McDonough School of Business alumni
Morgan State Bears men's track and field athletes